is a Japanese professional baseball pitcher for the Orix Buffaloes of the Nippon Professional Baseball (NPB).

Professional career
Yamamoto made his NPB debut on August 20, 2017 for the Orix Buffaloes. Yamamoto finished the 2021 season with an 18-5 record and 206 strikeouts across 193.2 innings pitched. His 1.39 ERA lead the Pacific League for the season. Yamamoto won the Pacific League MVP award following the season.

On June 18, 2022, Yoshinobu Yamamoto threw the year's fourth no-hitter and the 97th in Japanese pro baseball, pitching the Orix Buffaloes to a 2-0 Pacific League win over the Saitama Seibu Lions.

International career 
Yamamoto represented the Japan national baseball team in the 2019 exhibition games against Mexico and 2019 WBSC Premier12.

On February 27, 2019, he was selected at the 2019 exhibition games against Mexico.

On October 1, 2019, he was selected at the 2019 WBSC Premier12.

Playing style
Yamamoto is a 5 ft 10 in, 177 lb right-handed pitcher. With a three-quarters delivery, he throws a fastball averaging 94-95 mph (tops out at 99), a deceptive splitter, a cutter, and a curveball. Scouts said that the splitter is a legitimate out-pitch at the big league level. He also has great command, posting a BB/9 of 2.2 in his NPB career.

References

External links

Career statistics - NPB.jp

1998 births
Living people
Nippon Professional Baseball pitchers
Orix Buffaloes players
Baseball people from Okayama Prefecture
2019 WBSC Premier12 players
Baseball players at the 2020 Summer Olympics
Olympic baseball players of Japan
Olympic medalists in baseball
Olympic gold medalists for Japan
Medalists at the 2020 Summer Olympics
Nippon Professional Baseball MVP Award winners
2023 World Baseball Classic players